Lake Drive Apartments is a historic apartment building located at Baltimore, Maryland, United States. It is an 8-story high-rise building, built in 1919–1920, and designed by prominent local architect Edward L. Palmer, Jr. in the Classical Revival style.

Lake Drive Apartments was listed on the National Register of Historic Places in 2001.

References

External links
, including photo from 2001, at Maryland Historical Trust

Apartment buildings in Baltimore
Buildings and structures in Baltimore
Reservoir Hill, Baltimore
Residential buildings on the National Register of Historic Places in Baltimore
Residential buildings completed in 1920
Neoclassical architecture in Maryland